Dobson Township is one of fifteen townships in Surry County, North Carolina, United States. The township had a population of 8,088 according to the 2000 census.

Geographically, Dobson Township occupies  in central Surry County.  The only incorporated municipality within Dobson Township is the Town of Dobson, the county seat of Surry County.  Additionally, there are several smaller, unincorporated communities located here, including New Hope, Salem Fork and Union Cross.  The highest point in Dobson Township is Turner Mountain, elevation , which is the site of several communications towers.

Townships in Surry County, North Carolina
Townships in North Carolina